The Brides of Fu Manchu is a 1966 British/West German Constantin Film co-production adventure crime film based on the fictional Chinese villain Dr. Fu Manchu, created by Sax Rohmer. It was the second film in a series, and was preceded by The Face of Fu Manchu. The Vengeance of Fu Manchu followed in 1967, The Blood of Fu Manchu in 1968, and The Castle of Fu Manchu in 1969.  It was produced by Harry Alan Towers for Hallam Productions. Like the first film, it was directed by Don Sharp, and starred Christopher Lee as Fu Manchu. Nigel Green was replaced by Douglas Wilmer as Scotland Yard detective Nayland Smith.

The action takes place mainly in London, where much of the location filming took place.

Plot

In 1924, Dr. Fu Manchu, his army of dacoits and his vicious daughter Lin Tang are kidnapping the daughters of prominent scientists and taking them to his hidden base in the Atlas Mountains, where he demands that their fathers help him to build a device that transmits blast waves through a radio transmitter, which he intends to use to take over the world. He plans to keep (even wed) the girls in question. But Dr. Fu Manchu's archenemy, Nayland Smith of Scotland Yard, is determined not to let that happen.

Cast
Credits adapted from the booklet of the Powerhouse Films Blu-ray boxset The Fu Manchu Cycle: 1965-1969.

 Christopher Lee as Fu Manchu 
 Douglas Wilmer as Nayland Smith
 Heinz Drache as Franz Baumer  
 Marie Versini as Marie Lentz  
 Howard Marion-Crawford as Dr. Petrie  
 Tsai Chin as Lin Tang
 Rupert Davies as Jules Merlin  
 Kenneth Fortescue as Sergeant Spicer  
 Joseph Furst as Otto Lentz  
 Roger Hanin as Inspector Pierre Grimaldi  
 Harald Leipnitz as Nikki Sheldon  
 Carole Gray as Michel Merlin  
 Burt Kwouk as Feng
 Salmaan Peerzada as Abdul
 Eric Young as Control Assistant
 Wendy Gifford as Louise
 Poulet Tu as Lotus
 Sally Sheridan as Shiva
 Denis Holmes as Constable
 Maureen Beck as Nurse Brown
 Michael Chow as Guard
 Kristopher Kum as Wireless Operator
 Tommy Yapp as Dacoit

The Brides of Fu Manchu 

Ulla Berglin
Danielle Defrère
Evelyne Dhéliat
Yvonne Ekmann
Anje Langstraat
Katerina Quest
Lucille Soong
Christine Rau
Gaby Schär

Production
Sharp recalled producer Harry Alan Towers used the film to showcase "young and beautiful actresses". It was shot at Bray Studios (UK). Nigel Green was not available to repeat his performance as Nayland Smith so he was replaced by Douglas Wilmer. Sharp recalled filming went "smoothly but already the signs were there that" Towers could make Fu Manchu movies without having to "worry too much because the stories were okay. Well, there was more to making the movies than that."

References

External links

 
 
 

1966 films
1966 adventure films
1960s crime thriller films
British adventure films
British crime thriller films
West German films
1960s English-language films
English-language German films
Films directed by Don Sharp
Films set in 1924
Films based on British novels
Fu Manchu films
Films set in London
Films shot in London
1960s British films